The 1901 South Bend Athletic Association football team was an American football team that represented the South Bend Athletic Association in the 1901 football season.  Under legendary player coach Pat O'Dea, who also coached the Notre Dame football team in their 1901 football season, helped the South Bend Athletic Association to a 6–1–3 record.  The team outscored their opponents 139 to 24, posting five shutouts and three scoreless ties.  They played Notre Dame a record four times in one season, and held a record of 1–1–2 against the neighboring South Bend Collegiate team.  South Bend AA was also recognized as Athletic Club champions of the West, with wins over Titan AA, Shamrock AC of South Bend, and Detroit AC.  In the post-season, they played Rensselaer Athletic Club, who had been undefeated for three consecutive years, to a 0–0 tie.

Schedule

 The first three contests against Notre Dame were observed as practice games at the time, and Notre Dame only recognizes the September 28 contest as a match game.

References

South Bend Athletic Association
South Bend Athletic Association football seasons
South Bend Athletic Association football